The Woman Without a Soul is a 1920 German silent film directed by Léo Lasko and starring Edith Meller, Werner Krauss and Alfred Abel.

The film's sets were designed by the art directors Robert A. Dietrich and Robert Neppach.

Cast
 Edith Meller as Irene von Mengern
 Werner Krauss as Stephan Wulkowitz
 Alfred Abel as Gunar Magnussen
 Kurt Ehrle as Fabrikdirektor Brockmann
 Ferry Sikla as Bankier Steinberg
 Dora Tillmann as Lissy
 Dorrith van der Wyk as Anneliese, Kind von Brockmann
 Anna von Palen as Frau von Waldburg
 Marga Köhler

References

Bibliography
 Bock, Hans-Michael & Bergfelder, Tim. The Concise CineGraph. Encyclopedia of German Cinema. Berghahn Books, 2009.

External links

1920 films
Films of the Weimar Republic
German silent feature films
Films directed by Léo Lasko
German black-and-white films
1920s German films